Karthik or Kartik may refer to:

People with the given name

Kartik
 Kartik Aaryan (born 1990), Indian actor
 Kartik Chandran, American environmental engineer
 Kartik Jeshwant (born 1964), Indian cricketer
 Kartik Joshi (born 1995), Indian cricketer
 Kartik Oraon (1924-1981), Indian politician and Adivasi Member of Parliament
 Kartik Shetty (born 1987), Indian actor and director
 Kartik Tyagi (born 2000), Indian cricketer

Karthik
 Karthik (actor) (born 1960), Indian Tamil actor, politician and singer
 Karthik (singer) (born 1980), Indian singer
 Karthik Ghattamneni, Indian cinematographer and film director in Telugu cinema
 Karthik Jayaram, Indian actor in Kannada films
 Karthik Kumar (AKA Karthi, born 1977), Indian actor
 Karthik Naralasetty (born 1989), Indian businessman and entrepreneur
 Karthik Netha, Indian poet and lyricist
 Karthik Raj, Indian actor who works in Tamil film and television
 Karthik Raja (born 1973), Indian composer
 Karthik Sarma (born 1974/1975), Indian-American billionaire hedge fund manager
 Karthik Sivakumar (born 1977), better known as Karthi, Indian film actor in Tamil cinema
 Karthik Subbaraj, Indian film director, writer and producer

People with the surname

Kartik
 Kalpana Kartik (born 1931), Hindi film actress
 Murali Kartik (born 1976), Indian cricketer

Karthik
 Arun Karthik (born 1986), Indian cricketer
 Avishek Karthik, Indian film actor in Tamil films
 Dhanish Karthik (born 1989), Indian actor
 Dinesh Karthik (born 1985), Indian cricketer
 Dipika Pallikal Karthik (born 1991), Indian squash player
 Gautham Karthik (born 1989), Indian Tamil film actor
 Sabari Karthik (born 1990), Indian karate player
 Sai Karthik, or Sai Kartheek, Indian film score composer and music director
 T. M. Karthik, Indian stage and film actor

Other
 Kartik (month), a month in the Indian National, Tamil and Bengali calendars
 Kartik (Nepali calendar), the seventh month in the Nepali calendar
 Kartik (Gemma Doyle Trilogy), a character in a trilogy of fantasy novels
 Kartik BLT, Indian armoured vehicle-launched bridge (AVLB)

See also

 Kartikeya, the Hindu god of warfare
 Karlik (disambiguation)
 Karthi (born 1977), Indian film actor who works primarily in Tamil cinema
 Karthika (disambiguation)
 Karthikeyan
 Khatik

Hindu given names
Indian masculine given names